Ellie Gall (born 5 May 1996) is an Australian actress. She portrayed the main role of Catherine Langford alongside Connor Trinneer in the science fiction web-series Stargate Origins.

Filmography

Television

Film

References

External links

1996 births
Living people
Actresses from Sydney
Australian film actresses
Australian television actresses